A secondary school (or a high school) describes an institution that provides secondary education and also usually includes the building where this takes place. Some secondary schools provide both lower secondary education (ages 11 to 14) and upper secondary education (ages 14 to 18), i.e., both levels 2 and 3 of the ISCED scale, but these can also be provided in separate schools.

In the US, the secondary education system has separate middle schools and high schools. In the UK, most state schools and privately-funded schools accommodate pupils between the ages of 11–16 or 11–18; some UK private schools, i.e. public schools, admit pupils between the ages of 13 and 18.

Secondary schools follow on from primary schools and prepare for vocational or tertiary education. Attendance is usually compulsory for students until age 16. The organisations, buildings, and terminology are more or less unique in each country.

Levels of education
In the ISCED 2011 education scale levels 2 and 3 correspond to secondary education which are as follows:

 Lower secondary education First stage of secondary education building on primary education, typically with a more subject-oriented curriculum. Students are generally around 11–16 years old.
 Upper secondary education Second stage of secondary education and final stage of formal education for students typically aged 16–18, preparing for tertiary/adult education or providing skills relevant to employment, usually with an increased range of subject options and streams.

Terminology: descriptions of cohorts
Within the English-speaking world, there are three widely used systems to describe the age of the child. The first is the 'equivalent ages'; then countries that base their education systems on the 'English model' use one of two methods to identify the year group, while countries that base their systems on the 'American K–12 model' refer to their year groups as 'grades'. The Irish model is structured similarly to the English model, but differs significantly in terms of labels. This terminology extends into the research literature. Below is a comparison of some countries:

Legal framework
Schools exist within a strict legal framework, where they may be answerable to the church, the state through local authorities and their stakeholders. In England (but necessarily in other parts of the United Kingdom) there are six general types of state funded schools running in parallel to the private sector. The state takes an interest in safeguarding issues in all schools. All state-funded schools in England are legally required to have a website where they must publish details of their governance, finance, curriculum intent and staff and pupil protection policies to comply with ' The School Information (England) (Amendment) Regulations 2012 and 2016 '. Ofsted monitors these.

Theoretical framework

School building design does not happen in isolation. The building (or school campus) needs to accommodate:
 Curriculum content
 Teaching methods
 Costs
 Education within the political framework
 Use of school building (also in the community setting)
 Constraints imposed by the site
 Design philosophy

Each country will have  a different education system and priorities. Schools need to accommodate students, staff, storage, mechanical and electrical systems, support staff, ancillary staff and administration. The number of rooms required can be determined from the predicted roll of the school and the area needed.

According to standards used in the United Kingdom, a general classroom for 30 students needs to be 55 m2, or more generously 62 m2. A general art room for 30 students needs to be 83 m2, but 104 m2 for 3D textile work. A drama studio or a specialist science laboratory for 30 needs to be 90 m2. Examples are given on how this can be configured for a 1,200 place secondary (practical specialism). and 1,850 place secondary school.

Building design specifications 

The building providing the education has to fulfill the needs of: The students, the teachers, the non-teaching support staff, the administrators and the community. It has to meet general government building guidelines, health requirements, minimal functional requirements for classrooms, toilets and showers, electricity and services, preparation and storage of textbooks and basic teaching aids. An optimum secondary school will meet the minimum conditions and will have:

 adequately sized classrooms;
 specialized teaching spaces;
 a staff preparation room;
 an administration block;
 multipurpose classrooms;
 a general purpose school hall;
 laboratories for science, technology, mathematics and life sciences, as may be required;
 adequate equipment;
 a library or library stocks that are regularly renewed; and
 computer rooms or media centres.

Government accountants having read the advice then publish minimum guidelines on schools. These  enable environmental modelling and  establishing building costs. Future design plans are audited to ensure that these standards are met but not exceeded. Government ministries continue to press for the 'minimum' space and cost standards to be reduced.

The UK government published this downwardly revised space formula in 2014. It said the floor area should be 1050 m2 (+ 350 m2 if there is a sixth form) + 6.3 m2/pupil place for 11- to 16-year-old's + 7 m2/pupil place for post-16s. The external finishes were to be downgraded to meet a build cost of £1113/m2.

By country 

A secondary school locally may be called a high school (abbreviated as HS or H.S.), can also be called senior high school. In some countries there are two phases to secondary education (ISCED 2) and (ISCED 3), here the junior high school, intermediate school, lower secondary school, or middle school occurs between the primary school (ISCED 1) and high school.

See also
 Kindergarten
 List of schools by country
 Secondary education
 Tertiary education

References

External links

 Australian CensusAtSchool (Australia)
 Canadian Education Statistics Council (CESC) (United States)
 Office for National Statistics (ONS) (United Kingdom)
 BB103_Area_Guidelines_for_Mainstream_Schools (2014) UK 
 National Center for Education Statistics (NCES) (United States)
 OECD Standardised designs (2011)

High schools and secondary schools
School terminology
School types
Educational stages